Nabil Al Shahmeh (born 17 March 1974) is a former Syrian footballer who played for Syria national football team.

External links
worldfootball.net
11v11.com

1974 births
Syrian footballers
Living people
Syria international footballers
Place of birth missing (living people)
Al-Wahda SC (Syria) players
Taliya SC players
Al-Shorta Damascus players
Association football forwards
Syrian Premier League players